Two in One  is a film of 2007 by Russian-Ukrainian director Kira Muratova, starring Renata Litvinova, Natalia Buzko, Bogdan Stupka and Alexander Bashirov. The film unites two different screenplays written by   Yevgeny Golubenko and  Renata Litvinova.

It received the  Nika  prize for  Best Film of the Russian Commonwealth and Baltic States  in 2006.

At the 2007 Russian Guild of Film Critics Awards Kira Muratova received the Best Director prize for the film.

Production
Referring to the scene where Bogdan Stupka pulls Natalya Buzko's panties down, the actress said she hoped the shot wouldn't explicitly show her vulva, as it does. "I was sure that the scene would be filmed in such a way that it would be clear: they were taking off their tights, pants, but nothing superfluous would be seen. And when it came time to shoot this scene and there was half the film behind, I knew that the frame would be as it is. 'Kira, how? ..' - I asked. 'Yes, just like that,' was her answer. But I will say that in the context of the film, this scene is justified, although I do not like nudity," Buzko said.

References

External links

Russian comedy-drama films
2007 films
Films directed by Kira Muratova
Russian-language Ukrainian films
Ukrainian comedy-drama films
2000s Russian-language films